The missionary position is a sexual position.

The Missionary Position or Missionary Position may also refer to:


Literature
The Missionary Position, a 1992 satire of televangelism by Bruce Dickinson
The Missionary Position: Mother Teresa in Theory and Practice, a 1995 extended essay by English-American journalist and literary critic Christopher Hitchens

Music
The Missionary Position (band), an American rock band
"Missionary Position", a song by Heckle
"Missionary Position", a song by Paint It Black from New Lexicon
"Missionary Position", a song by Sparks from Hippopotamus

Theatre and television
The Missionary Position, a 2006 play by Keith Reddin
"The Missionary Position" (NCIS), an episode of the television series NCIS